The Honours Committee is a committee within the Cabinet Office of the Government of the United Kingdom formed to review nominations for national honours for merit, exceptional achievement or service. Twice yearly the Honours Committee submits formal recommendations for the British monarch's New Years and Birthday Honours. Members of the Honours Committee—which comprises a main committee and nine subcommittees in speciality areas—research and vet nominations for national awards, including knighthoods and the Order of the British Empire.

History

The honours system is an ancient one, particularly in Britain; Æthelstan, King of the English in the 10th century, was knighted by his grandfather, Alfred the Great. Knighthoods were originally conferred as a military honour, often on the battlefield. Later it became customary for only the reigning monarch to bestow the honour. Other honours beyond knighthood were later established, including the Order of the Bath in 1725. In the 20th century, the "Ceremonial Branch" of the government was created in 1937 with the sole purpose of overseeing the honours system. In 2001, the committee became officially known as the Ceremonial Honours and Appointments Secretariat.

Since 1993, members of the public have been eligible to nominate individuals; government agencies may also formally put forward candidates. All citizens of the United Kingdom and Commonwealth nations can be nominated. Non-citizens are eligible for honorary awards.

Following his retirement as Permanent Secretary to the Lord Chancellor's Office, Sir Hayden Phillips prepared a report in July 2004 to the  Cabinet Secretary suggesting a reform of the current honours nomination system. The next year, following recommendations made in Phillips' report, a new system of eight committees was organised, with each committee focussing on a special area. (In 2012, an additional committee was added.) The committees are composed of senior civil servants and independent experts in specific fields. The majority of the honours committees are non-civil servants.

Each subcommittee oversees nominations for its specialised area: Arts and Media; Community, Voluntary and Local Services; Economy; Education; Health; Parliamentary and Political Service; Science and Technology; Sport; and State. The individual committees assess the nominations and pass the nominations to the Main Honours Committee, whose members select the final list of nominations that are passed to the Queen by the Prime Minister.

Following the Cash for Honours scandal, the Main Honours Committee is required to determine that an individual's nomination for an honour has not been influenced by campaign and political contributions. According to the Cabinet Office's 2011 report, "The Main Honours Committee must satisfy itself that a party political donation has not influenced the decision to award an honour in any way; the committee must be confident that the candidate would have been a meritorious recipient of an honour if he or she had not made a political donation."

The Cabinet's Honours Committee nominates civilians only; military honours, such as the Victoria Cross and the George Cross, are sent to the Queen by the Honours and Decorations Committee of the Ministry of Defence. The honours committee also does not make nominations for peerages, which are created directly by the monarch.

Committees

Main committee
Sir Tom Scholar KCB - Permanent Secretary, HM Treasury (Chair)
The Cabinet Secretary
Chair of Arts and Media Committee: Rupert Gavin
Chair of Community, Voluntary and Local Services Committee: Baroness Casey of Blackstock DBE CB
Chair of the Economy Committee: Sir Ian Cheshire
Chair of Education Committee: Sir Daniel Moynihan
Chair of Health Committee: The Rt Hon. Lord Kakkar KBE PC
Chair of Parliamentary and Political Service Committee: Lord Sherbourne of Didsbury CBE
Chair of Public Service Committee: Prof. Dame Barbara Monroe DBE
Chair of Science and Technology Committee: Prof. Sir John Bell GBE
Chair of Sport Committee: The Rt Hon. Sir Hugh Robertson KCMG DL
Chair of State Committee: Mark Addison CB
Permanent Under Secretary, Foreign, Commonwealth and Development Office
The Chief of Defence Staff

Arts and Media
Rupert Gavin – chair, Historic Royal Palaces (Independent chair)

Independent members
Sir Peter Bazalgette - chair, ITV
Sir Nicholas Kenyon CBE - Managing Director, Barbican Centre
Kanya King CBE - CEO, MOBO Organisation Ltd
Caroline Michel - chair, Hay Literary Festival
Kenneth Olumuyiwa Tharp CBE FRSA - Freelance Arts Professional
Alice Rawsthorn OBE - Design critic and author.

Official members
Sarah Healey CB - Permanent Secretary, Department for Digital, Culture, Media and Sport
Leslie Evans – Permanent Secretary, Scottish Government

Community and Voluntary Services
Baroness Casey of Blackstock DBE CB (Chair)

Independent members
Harris Bokhari OBE - Co-founder of the Naz Legacy Foundation and Ambassador of British Asian Trust
Rabbi Dr Harvey Belovski - Rabbi, Golders Green United Synagogue
Carly Jones MBE - Autism Advocate
Ros Kerslake OBE - Chief Executive of Heritage Lottery Fund & NHMF
Adeeba Malik CBE - Deputy Chief Executive, QED UK
Waheed Saleem - Managing Director, Waldoc Ltd
Ben Summerskill OBE - Chair of the Silver Line and Director of the Criminal Justice Alliance
John Booth - Chairman of the Prince's Trust

Official members
Jeremy Pocklington CB - Permanent Secretary, Ministry of Housing, Communities and Local Government
Dame Shan Morgan DCMG - Permanent Secretary, Welsh Government
Sarah Healey CB - Permanent Secretary, Department for Digital, Culture, Media and Sport

Economy
Sir Ian Cheshire - chairman, Barclay's UK (Independent chair)

Independent members
Prof. Heather McGregor CBE - Executive Dean, Edinburgh Business School
Baroness Shafik DBE - Director, London School of Economics and Political Science
Dame Inga Beale DBE- lately CEO, Lloyd's of London
Sir Douglas Flint CBE - former Group Chairman of HSBC Holdings
Dame Vivian Hunt DBE - managing partner for the consulting firm McKinsey & Company
1 x Vacancy

Official members
Sarah Munby - Permanent Secretary, Department for Business, Energy and Industrial Strategy
Sarah Healey CB - Permanent Secretary, Department for Digital, Culture, Media and Sport
Charles Roxburgh - Second Permanent Secretary, HM Treasury
Leslie Evans – Permanent Secretary, Scottish Government

Education
 Sir Daniel Moynihan – Chief Executive, Harris Federation (Independent chair)

Independent members
Prof. Sir David Eastwood DL - Vice Chancellor, University of Birmingham
Dr John Guy OBE - former sixth form principal and education consultant
Dame Asha Khemka DBE DL - British Educator
Dame Alison Peacock DBE DL - Chief Executive, Chartered College of Teaching
Prof. Steven West CBE DL - Vice Chancellor, University of the West of England
1 x Vacancy

Official members
Vacancy - Head of Northern Ireland Civil Service
Susan Acland-Hood - Permanent Secretary, Department for Education

Health
The Rt Hon. Lord Kakkar PC – Director, Thrombosis Research Institute (Independent chair)

Independent members
Sir David Behan CBE - Chief Executive of the Care Quality Commission
Prof. Sir Leszek Borysiewicz - Vice Chancellor, University of Cambridge
Prof. Dame Jane Dacre DBE - President of the Royal College of Physicians
Baroness Harding of Winscombe - Chair of NHS Improvement
Prof. Karen Middleton CBE - Chief Executive, Chartered Society of Physiotherapy
Prof. Iqbal Singh OBE - chair, Centre of Excellence and Safety for Older People (CESOP)
 1 x Vacancy

Official members
Prof. Chris Whitty CB - Chief Medical Officer (England)
Shona Dunn – Second Permanent Secretary, Home Office
Dr Andrew Goodall CBE - Director General, Department for Health, Social Services and Children, Welsh Government

Parliamentary and Political Service
Lord Sherbourne of Didsbury CBE – Member, House of Lords (Independent chair)

Independent members
Dr Sue Griffiths - Executive Director, Global Partners Governance
The Rt Hon. Lord Haselhurst PC
Lord Lisvane KCB DL - Former Clerk of the House of Commons
 Dame Denise Platt DBE - Member of the General Medical Council and member of the Solicitors Regulation Authority
Sir Paul Silk KCB - President of Study of Parliament Group
1 x Vacancy

Official members
The Rt Hon. Mark Spencer MP - Government Chief Whip
The Rt Hon. Sir Alan Campbbell MP - Opposition Chief Whip

Public Service
Dame Barbara Monroe DBE - Chief Executive, St Christopher's Hospice (Chair)

Independent members
Emir Feisal JP, Trustee, Magistrates Association
Alistair Finlay OBE, Faculty Director of Operations, Queen's University Belfast
Dr Shonaig Macpherson CBE - Former interim Chairman of Interim Business School
Maggy Pigott CBE - Vice Chair, Open Age
Riaz Ravat BEM DL - Board Member Leicester and Rutland Community Foundation
The Ven. Canon David Stanton - Archdeacon and Canon of Westminster Abbey

Official Members
Jeremy Pocklington CB, Permanent Secretary, Ministry of Housing, Communities and Local Government
Mike Driver CB - Interim Permanent Secretary, Ministry of Justice
Matthew Rycroft CBE, Permanent Secretary, Home Office
Susan Acland-Hood - Permanent Secretary, Department for Education
Antonia Romeo - Permanent Secretary, Ministry of Justice
Dame Shan Morgan DCMG – Permanent Secretary, Welsh Government

Science and Technology
Prof. Sir John Bell GBE FRS – Regius Professor of Medicine, University of Oxford (Independent chair)

Independent members
Prof. Dame Glynis Breakwell DBE DL - Vice chancellor, University of Bath
Naomi Climer CBE - Trustee, Institution of Engineering and Technology
Prof. Andrew Scott - Professor of Economics, London Business School
Prof. Sir Keith Burnett, CBE, FRS - British physicist and past Vice-Chancellor of the University of Sheffield
Prof. Dame Ottoline Leyser DBE FRS - Director and Professor of Plant Development
2x Vacancy

Official members
Prof. Sheila Rowan CBE FRS - Chief Scientific Adviser for Scotland
Sir Patrick Vallance FRS - Chief Scientific Adviser to HM Government
Prof. Paul Monks, Chief Scientific Adviser, BEIS

Sport
The Rt Hon. Sir Hugh Robertson KCMG DL - Chair of the British Olympic Association (Chair)

Independent members
Pippa Britton - chair, Disability Sport Wales
Tom Clarke - Former Sports Journalist
Donna Fraser OBE - Vice President of UK Athletics
Liz Nicholl CBE - Chief Executive, UK Sport

Official members
Sarah Healey CB - Permanent Secretary, Department for Digital, Culture, Media and Sport
Vacancy - Head of Northern Ireland Civil Service

State
Mark Addison CB - Public Appointments Assessor and former Civil Service Commissioner (Independent chair)

Independent members
Sarah Anderson CBE - Chief Executive, The Listening Place.
Isabel Doverty - Civil Service Commissioner
Sir David Hempleman-Adams KCVO OBE KStJ DL - chair, Global Resins limited, Founder and Director of Hempleman Investment Company
Jenny Rowe CB - Former CEO, Supreme Court
Sir John Scarlett KCMG OBE - chairman, SC Strategy Limited

Official members
Tamara Finkelstein CB - Permanent Secretary, Department for Environment, Food and Rural Affairs
Sir Tom Scholar KCB - Permanent Secretary, HM Treasury

Diversity and Inclusion Group
A group of independent committee members oversee the honours system's work to embed diversity and equality. It meets twice a year to assess the statistical trends and to maintain momentum behind continuing improvements, and outreach activity.

Chair - Lady Casey of Blackstock DBE CB

Independent members
 Naomi Climer - Vice President, Royal Academy of Engineering
 Emir Feisal JP, Trustee, the Henry Smith Charity
 Donna Fraser - Vice President, UK Athletics
 Rupert Gavin (Chair, Arts & Media) - chair, Historic Royal Palaces
 Dr Sue Griffiths - Managing Director, Social Development Direct
 Dame Asha Khemka DBE DL - British Educator
 Prof. Heather McGregor CBE - Executive Dean, Edinburgh Business School, Heriot-Watt University
 Dame Denise Platt – Member, General Medical Council and Member, Solicitors Regulation Authority
 Jenny Rowe CB - Former CEO, Supreme Court
 Prof. Iqbal Singh - chair, Centre of Excellence and Safety for Older People (CESOP)
 Ben Summerskill OBE – chair, Silver Line and Director, Criminal Justice Alliance

Official members
Permanent Secretary, Department for Digital, Culture, Media and Sport
Permanent Secretary, Permanent Secretary, Ministry of Housing, Communities and Local Government

See also
Honours Forfeiture Committee

References

External links
Gov.uk: Honours Committees

British honours system
Committees of the United Kingdom Cabinet Office
2005 establishments in the United Kingdom